Johannes van Hooydonk (born 1782 in Ginneken) was a Dutch clergyman and bishop for the Roman Catholic Diocese of Breda. He was ordained in 1827. He was appointed bishop in 1853. He died in 1868.

References 

Dutch Roman Catholic bishops
1782 births

1868 deaths